The Kansas Bar Association (KBA) is a voluntary, non-profit bar association for the state of Kansas with the headquarters located in The Robert L. Gernon Law Center at 12th and Harrison St. in Topeka. The KBA has approximately 6,500 members and was founded in 1882.

Membership 
Any person in good standing with their state bar may become a member of the association. Only members may vote and hold office in the association.

Membership dues vary depending on how long an attorney has practiced, with special consideration given to particular areas of law, including legal services attorneys.

Any member of the KBA who has been admitted to the bar for 50 years, and is a current member in good standing shall automatically become a life member of the KBA and be exempt from paying annual dues.

The Kansas Bar Association has an elected board of governors, with president being the highest level of the hierarchy. Each president has a term, excluding a few exceptions, of one year.

Publications 
The Kansas Bar Association is dedicated to providing its members with current information about the law through publications, both print and electronic, and through social networking websites.

Continuing Legal Education 
Continuing legal education (CLE) courses are required in Kansas to remain in good standing with the Kansas Supreme Court, which is required to practice law in Kansas. The KBA offers many CLEs to both members and non-members throughout the year. The Annual Meeting traditionally rotates each year to one of three locations (Overland Park, KS, Topeka, KS, or Wichita, KS). Although the locations have changed, the event has been ongoing for over a century.

Sections 
The Kansas Bar Association provides opportunities for attorneys to join sections of law they practice for a fee. The offered sections are listed below:

Politics 
The Kansas Bar Association created a political action committee (PAC) in 2009.

References

External links 
 www.ksbar.org - The Kansas Bar Association website.
 State and Local Bar Associations - A graphic and listing of state and local bar associations in the US, divided by unified and voluntary associations.

American state bar associations
Kansas law
Organizations established in 1882
1882 establishments in Kansas
Organizations based in Topeka, Kansas